The Advent is a quarterly magazine produced by the Sri Aurobindo Ashram, and is "Dedicated to the Exposition of Sri Aurobindo's Vision of the Future".

History and profile
The first issue of The Advent appeared on 21 February 1944. Early issues were printed in Madras, later on publication was relocated to the ashram at Pondicherry. The magazine is published in English on quarterly basis.

The Advent often featured material by Sri Aurobindo. Chapters VI to XII of The Synthesis of Yoga in their revised form first appeared serially from August 1946 to April 1948. Sections of Savitri were published in 1946 and 1947. A series of six articles from Sri Aurobindo's early writings (the Baroda period), comprising Philosophy of the Upanishads and one On Translating the Upanishads, appeared in The Advent in 1953. A number of aphorisms and later poems and also translations of a number of hymns to Indra (the latter was later published in The Secret of the Veda) have also appeared.

Nolini Kanta Gupta was the editor until he died in 1983 when M. P. Pandit took over. Samir Kanto Gupta is the present editor.

Other journals relating to Sri Aurobindo Ashram in Puducherry are Arya, Sri Aurobindo Mandir Annual, Sri Aurobindo Circle, Mother India World Union, Collaboration and Auroville Today.

Selected articles 
Sri Aurobindo on the Ideal of Work. Indra Sen August 1945
Is Sri Aurobindo a Mystic? Sisir Kumar Maitra August 1946
Integral Yoga and Physical Immortality. T. V. Kapali Sastry - April 1948
The Integral Autonomy of Being. Rishabhchand - November 1953
East-West Synthesis in Sri Aurobindo. Indra Sen November 1954
Concept of Man in Sri Aurobindo. Indra Sen April 1957
The Integral Weltanschauung. V. Madhusudan Reddy - November 1963
Integral Yoga of Sri Aurobindo and The Mother. Indra Sen August 1966
The integral Personality. Indra Sen November 1966
The Yogic Approach to Administration. Indra Sen February 1967
Personality and integral Yoga. Indra Sen November 1967
The Supramental Truth. Indra Sen April 1968

References

 A. B. Purani, Life Of Sri Aurobindo, Sri Aurobindo Ashram, Pondicherry

Resources from the Internet Archive 
 1947, 361 pages
 The Advent Vol-ii No-3 (August 1945)
 April 1981
 Vol 24,25 1967

Magazines established in 1944
Quarterly magazines published in India
Religious magazines
Sri Aurobindo
English-language magazines published in India
1944 establishments in India